Niablé is a town in eastern Ivory Coast. It is a sub-prefecture and commune of Abengourou Department in Indénié-Djuablin Region, Comoé District. A few hundred metres southwest of the town is a border crossing with Ghana.
In 2021, the population of the sub-prefecture of Niablé was 57,081.

Villages
The tenth villages of the sub-prefecture of Niablé and their population in 2014 are:

References

Sub-prefectures of Indénié-Djuablin
Ghana–Ivory Coast border crossings
Communes of Indénié-Djuablin